Bacchisa pallidiventris is a species of beetle in the family Cerambycidae. It was described by Thomson in 1865. It is known from China, Laos and Vietnam.

References

P
Beetles described in 1865